The 9th Hollywood Music in Media Awards was held on November 14, 2018 to recognize the best in music in film, TV, video games, commercials, and trailers. The nominations were announced on October 16, 2018. The winners were announced on November 14, 2018.

Winners and nominees

Jerry Goldsmith Award
Carlos Rafael Rivera

References

External links
Official website

Hollywood Music in Media Awards
Hollywood Music in Media Awards
Hollywood Music in Media Awards
Hollywood Music in Media Awards
Hollywood Music in Media Awards